Paradise Circus may mean:

 Paradise, Birmingham, formerly known as Paradise Circus
 Four Walls / Paradise Circus a musical collaboration between Massive Attack and Burial
 Paradise Circus, the second album by the English band the Lilac Time